Rasathanthram is a 2006 Indian Malayalam-language family drama film written and directed by Sathyan Anthikkad and starring Mohanlal and Meera Jasmine, with Bharath Gopi,Innocent, Oduvil Unnikrishnan, and Mamukkoya in prominent roles. The film was produced by Antony Perumbavoor through Aashirvad Cinemas. The soundtrack album was composed by Ilaiyaraaja, while Alagappan N. handled the cinematography.

Rasathanthram was released in theatres on 7 April 2006 and received positive reviews with critics praising performance of Mohanlal, Gopy and Jasmine. The film performed well at the box office, it grossed ₹21 crore worldwide and completed 100 days theatrical run.

Plot

Premachandran is a carpenter who lives along with his father, Balan Master, and works along with his friend, Manikandan. They are now working on a house near the house of a rich landlord. Kanmani, who was sold by her mother, works in that house as a servant and is ill-treated. Seethamma lives along with her daughter, Kumari, who has a liking towards Premachandran.

One night, Premachandran goes to his workplace to take his tools. He sees Kanmani leaving the house and is puzzled. He follows her. She was on the verge of committing suicide when Premachandran rescues her. He gives her shelter in one room in a building owned by Chettiyar, telling Chettiyar that his friend did not get the bus to go back home. Kanmani dresses up as a boy by the name of Velayuthan Kutty and soon starts working with Manikandan and Premachandran. Balan Master starts liking the disguised boy.

One day, Premachandran tells Kanmani that he has planned to rescue her by sending her to Tamil Nadu to work in a banyan company where Premachandran's friend is working. Kanmani refuses to go. Premachandran accidentally confesses to Manikandan that Velayuthan Kutty is actually the missing Kanmani. Manikandan has no peace and shouts out the truth in the middle of the night. Two policemen, accidentally hear this and take Premachandran and Kanmani into custody.

Kanmani tells the court that she and Premachandran are in love and intended to elope. She said this to avoid imprisonment. Soon, Kanmani develops an affection towards Premachandran. Premachandran tells her that she does not know anything about him and that he is an ex-convict in a murder case. Actually, Premachandran's friend Sivan murdered a hooligan who abused Premachandran's sister. Kanmani now agrees to go to Tamil Nadu, but Premachandran does not let her go, he admits her in a hostel.

Premachandran's brother, Rajendran, comes to the fray and asks Balan Master to attend his daughter's marriage. He asks that Premachandran not come. Actually, Balan Master and Premachandran are living far away from home because of the bad nature shown by Premachandran's brother and sister. Balan Master is not willing to go without Premachandran. Premachandran who loves his niece as his daughter changes Balan Master's mind, by going with him without anybody knowing he is there. On returning, they see their rented house being destroyed. Balan Master takes shelter in an old age home headed by a retired Colonel until a new house can be rented.

Premachandran goes to Kochi to meet Sivan – who is now a business tycoon, but Sivan does not meet Premachandran's needs. On returning, Premachandran finds out that Balan Master is dead. He performs the ceremonial rites and goes to Kanmani. Meanwhile, Kanmani's so called uncle (Jagathty Sreekumar) – who wants to marry Kanmani – and his sister have court orders to take Kanmani back to Tamil Nadu. But, Premachandran grabs the "thali mala" from Sundara Pandian, ties the knot on Kanmani and subsequently marries her.

Cast

 Mohanlal as Premachandran / Preman / Premettan, a successful carpenter
 Bharath Gopi as Balan Master, Ramachandran and Premachandran's father
 Meera Jasmine as Kanmani / Velayudhan Kutty
 Innocent as Manikandan Aashari, the lead-carpenter
 Mamukkoya as Kunjoottan, Manikandan's brother-in-law
 Oduvil Unnikrishnan as Ganeshan Chettiyar, Premachandran's house owner
 K. P. A. C. Lalitha as Seethamma, Premachandran's neighbour
 Muthumani as Kumari, Seethamma's daughter
 Bindu Panicker as Sobhana, Manikandan Aashari's wife
 Siddique as Ramachandran, Premachandran's elder brother
 Mukesh as Shivan, Premachandran's childhood friend (Cameo appearance)
 Jagathi Sreekumar as Vetrivel Sundara Pandiyan (Cameo appearance)
 Suraj Venjaramoodu as Suresh Carpenter
 Anoop Chandran as Kunjambu, Video shop owner
 P. Sreekumar as Roychan
 T. G. Ravi as Retd Colonel Santhosh Kumar
 Manjusha Sajish as Sreekutty
 Reshmi Boban as Lucy, Roy's sister
 Bindu Murali as Nancy, Roy's wife
 Maneesha K S as Tessy, Roy's sister
 TP Radhamani
 Sethu Lakshmi as Roy's Servant
 Nivia Rebin as Ancymol
Vijayan Karanthoor as CI Aliyan

Production 
Rasathanthram is the debut screenplay of Sathyan Anthikkad. Initially Anthikkad thought of giving someone else the scripting duty, but his regular collaborator were busy with other project, so he decided to write the film himself. Rasathanthram became his first film to begin filming with a complete script. Anthikkad describes the storyline as "it is the essence of the chemistry of the duo's life that develops with the rasas (humours) and little thantras (techniques) played by them to earn their living. In general, it delves into the meaninglessness of relationships and the ultimate values of human love". The film was shot at various locations in Thodupuzha, Moolamattom, and nearby places in Idukki district.

Soundtrack

The songs were composed by Ilaiyaraaja and lyrics were penned by Gireesh Puthenchery.

Box office
Rasathanthram was released on 7 April 2006 in Kerala. Including print and publicity, it was made on a budget of ₹2.87 crore. The film had record collection in 27 releasing stations in Kerala. Rasathanthram grossed ₹21 crore from worldwide box office, becoming the 2nd highest-grossing Malayalam film of the year. It completed 100 days theatrical run.

Awards
Mathrubhumi Film Awards
Best Director – Sathyan Anthikkad
Best Character Actress – Muthumani
Best Cinematography – Azhagappan N.
Best Art Director – Prashanth Madhav
All India Radio Awards
Best Male Actor – Mohanlal
Best Director – Sathyan Anthikkad
Kerala Film Critics Association Awards
Best Female Playback Singer – Manjari
Asianet Film Awards
Best Comic Actor – Innocent
Best Female Playback Singer – Manjari

Trivia

 Sathyan Anthikkad and Mohanlal teamed up again after 12 years for this movie. Their previous movie was Pingami (1994).
 The film collaborates seven National Film Award winners, Ilaiyaraaja, Yesudas, Chithra in offscreen and Bharath Gopi, Mohanlal, Meera Jasmine and K. P. A. C. Lalitha on screen.
 The screenplay was released as a book in August 2006 by DC Books.

References

External links
 Rasathanthram

2006 films
2000s Malayalam-language films
Films directed by Sathyan Anthikad
Films with screenplays by Sathyan Anthikad
Films shot in Munnar
Cross-dressing in Indian films
Films scored by Ilaiyaraaja
Aashirvad Cinemas films